Two ships of the Royal Navy have been named HMS Bergamot after the bergamot flower.

 , a  launched in 1941. She served in World War II and was sold in 1946.

References
 

Royal Navy ship names